Lac Jamras Rittidet (born 1 February 1989) is a Thai athlete specialising in the 110 metres hurdles. He won the bronze medal at the 2014 Asian Games. He also represented his country at the 2013 and 2015 World Championships without qualifying for the semifinals.

He has personal bests of 13.61 seconds in the 110 metres hurdles (Incheon 2014) and 7.78 seconds in the 60 metres hurdles (Hanoi 2009). Both are current national records. He has won 4 consecutive gold medals at the Southeast Asian Games from 2009 to 2015 in the 110 metres hurdles.

Competition record

References

1989 births
Living people
Jamras Rittidet
Athletes (track and field) at the 2010 Asian Games
Athletes (track and field) at the 2014 Asian Games
Jamras Rittidet
Asian Games medalists in athletics (track and field)
Jamras Rittidet
Southeast Asian Games medalists in athletics
Jamras Rittidet
Medalists at the 2014 Asian Games
Competitors at the 2009 Southeast Asian Games
Competitors at the 2011 Southeast Asian Games
Competitors at the 2013 Southeast Asian Games
Competitors at the 2015 Southeast Asian Games
Jamras Rittidet